Nyzhnia Duvanka is an urban-type settlement in Sloboda Ukraine, in the Svatove Raion of the Luhansk Oblast of Ukraine. Population:

History
On 14 December 1960, Nizhnyaya Duvanka received the status of an urban-type settlement. In July 1995, the Cabinet of Ministers approved the decision to privatize the state farm located here.

References

Urban-type settlements in Svatove Raion
Svatove Raion